Lot 1 is a township in Prince County, Prince Edward Island, Canada created during the 1764–1766 survey of Samuel Holland.  It is part of North Parish.

Population
 1,881  (2006 census)
 1,900 (2001 census)
 1,936  (1996 census)

Communities

Incorporated municipalities:

 St. Felix
 Tignish
 Tignish Shore

Civic address communities:

 Anglo Tignish
 Ascension
 Christopher Cross
 Harper
 Judes Point
 Leoville
 Nail Pond
 Norway
 Palmer Road
 Peterville
 Pleasant View
 Seacow Pond
 Skinners Pond
 St. Felix
 St. Peter and St. Paul
 Tignish
 Tignish Corner
 Tignish Shore
 Waterford

History

The township went through various owners under feudalism when Prince Edward Island was a British colony prior to Canadian Confederation:

 Sir Philip Stephens, 1st Baronet First Secretary of the Admiralty  (1767-1810)
 In Chancery  (1838)
 Messrs. Palmer and Ed. Cunard, Esq. (1864)

01
Geography of Prince County, Prince Edward Island